Sehuri Dam is a rockfill dam located in Fukuoka Prefecture in Japan. The dam is used for water supply. The catchment area of the dam is 5.5 km2. The dam impounds about 32  ha of land when full and can store 4500 thousand cubic meters of water. The construction of the dam was started on 1970 and completed in 1976.

References

Dams in Fukuoka Prefecture
1976 establishments in Japan